MSCE can mean:

 Master of Science in Civil Engineering; see Civil engineering
 Master of Science in Clinical Epidemiology
 Master of Science in Communications Engineering; see Telecommunications engineering
 Master of Science in Computer Engineering; see Computer Engineering
 Microsoft Certified Solutions Expert; see Microsoft certifications
 Mobility and Supply Chain Engineering